The 2010 UAB Blazers football team represented the University of Alabama at Birmingham in the college football season of 2010–2011. The Blazers, led by fourth year head coach Neil Callaway, played their home games at Legion Field in Birmingham, Alabama and competed in the East Division of Conference USA. They finished the season 4–8, 3–5 in C-USA play.

Schedule

References

UAB
UAB Blazers football seasons
UAB Blazers football